KRW may refer to:

South Korean won, the currency of South Korea
the IATA code of Turkmenbashi Airport
the ISO 639 code for the Western Krahn language